The San Francisco Shock are an American professional Overwatch esports team based in San Francisco, California. The Shock compete in the Overwatch League (OWL) as a member of the league's West region. Founded in 2017, the San Francisco Shock is one of the twelve founding members of the OWL and is one of three professional Overwatch teams in California. The team is owned by Andy Miller, co-owner of the Sacramento Kings and NRG Esports. The Shock have won three midseason tournament titles, qualified for three season playoffs, won two back-to-back OWL Grand Finals, making them one of the most accomplished franchises in OWL history.

Franchise history

Beginnings 
On July 12, 2017, Overwatch developer Activision Blizzard officially announced that Andy Miller, co-founder and co-owner of the American esports organization NRG Esports, had acquired a San Francisco-based Overwatch League franchise spot for an estimated $20 million. "The local aspect of the league was the biggest attraction [for purchasing the spot]," said Miller in an interview. "One of the biggest issues with esports, and also part of its charm, is that you can create a global audience. You can have fans all over the world. But it’s always become a big challenge for fans to actually see their favorite teams. You have to fly to a major event or a finals somewhere in a major city. And there was never a hometown team."

On September 28, 2017, NRG Esports announced its official inaugural roster of eight players and head coach Bradford Rajani. A month later, on October 16, the franchise name was revealed as the San Francisco Shock.

2018: Inaugural season 

The Shock entered the 2018 season with a 9-player roster, which included two underage players, damage player Jay "sinatraa" Won and tank player Matthew "super" DeLisi, who would not be eligible to play until March. The franchise's first-ever OWL regular season match was a 0–4 loss against the Los Angeles Valiant on January 10, 2018. After a rough start to the season, the team picked up two more players in damage player Park "Architect" Min-ho and support player Grant "Moth" Espe on March 13. The team maxed out their roster with the signing of tank player Choi "ChoiHyoBin" Hyo-bin several weeks later. The Shock found more success after these pickups, as well as super and sinatraa becoming eligible to play, posting a 6–4 record in Stage 3, only missing out on the Stage 3 playoffs due to a tiebreaker. After a 12–18 record throughout the first three quarters of the season, the Shock released head coach Rajani and picked up former Boston Uprising head coach Park "Crusty" Dae-hee, who had just led the Uprising to a perfect 10–0 record in Stage 3. The team split their final 10 games of the season, finishing in ninth place overall with a 17–23 regular season record.

2019–2020: Back-to-back championships 

The Shock made several roster additions in the offseason preceding the 2019 season, including tank player Yoo "Smurf" Myeong-hwan, support player Park "Viol2t" Min-ki, and damage player Gwon "Striker" Nam-ju.

The Shock finished the first stage of the season with a 4–3 record and the sixth seed in the Stage 1 Playoffs. The team made it to the Stage 1 finals, where they faced the undefeated Vancouver Titans. Behind particularly strong performances by the tank duo super and ChoiHyoBin, the Shock nearly pulled off an upset over the Titans, leading the match 3–2 at one point, but they ultimately lost, 3–4. San Francisco hit their stride in Stage 2, finished the stage with a perfect 7–0 record and 28–0 map record, making them the first team ever to have a perfect stage. Qualified as the top seed in the Stage 2 Playoffs, again reached the stage finals, where they, again, faced the Titans. Much like the last meeting, super, ChoiHyoBin, and Viol2t played critical roles in the match; this time, the Shock came out with a win, defeating the Titans by a score of 4–2. In Stage 3, San Francisco once again reached the playoff finals, where they faced the Shanghai Dragons; however, the Shock lost the match by a 3–4 scoreline. The team finished the regular season with seven straight wins to post a 23–5 record, the second best in the league, and the third seed in the season playoffs. Sinatraa, super, ChoiHyoBin, and Moth were awarded with Role Star commendations on the season, and both sinatraa and super were nominated for the league's Most Valuable Player award, which sinatraa ultimately won.

San Francisco faced the sixth-seeded Atlanta Reign in the first round of the 2019 season playoffs, a double-elimination tournament, but the team fell in a 3–4 loss to drop to the lower bracket. The Shock responded to the loss by running through the lower bracket, sweeping the London Spitfire, the Los Angeles Gladiators, the Hangzhou Spark, and the New York Excelsior to secure a spot in the 2019 Grand Finals. Led by Grand Finals MVP ChoiHyoBin and regular season MVP sinatraa, the Shock swept the Titans, 4–0, in the Grand Finals to claim their first OWL championship title.

For the 2020 season, the Shock debuted new colors, trading the orange, grey, and gold color scheme that the team had used for two years, in favor of black and silver, as an homage to the Oakland Raiders, with orange as an accent. Heading into their 2020 season, the Shock picked up sniper specialist Lee "Ans" Seon-chang in the offseason.

After starting the season with a 5–2 record, 2019 MVP sinatraa retired from competitive Overwatch to pursue a career in Valorant. Three weeks later, the Shock transferred DPS Park "Architect" Min-ho to the Hangzhou Spark and signed former Vancouver Titans flex support Lee "Twilight" Joo-seok. The Shock won their franchise's second midseason tournament title on May 24, 2020, after defeating the Florida Mayhem in the North American May Melee finals, 4–2, behind an aggressive playstyle from super. Having lost not a match since March, the Shock claimed the top seed in the North American Summer Showdown; however, the team fell to the Paris Eternal in the semifinals. The Shock continued their regular season win streak throughout July and claimed the top seed in the North America Countdown Cup. San Francisco reached the finals, where they took down the Philadelphia Fusion to claim their second midseason tournament title of the 2020 season. In their first match after the title win, the Shock again faced the Fusion and were swept 0–3, ending their regular season win streak and locking them into the second seed of the North America playoffs bracket. The team finished the regular season with 18 wins, 7 bonus wins from midseason tournaments, and 3 losses, giving them an effective regular season record of 25–3. Ans, ChoiHyoBin, and Viol2t were awarded Role Star commendations on the season, while ChoiHyoBin and Viol2t were also nominated for the league's most valuable player award.

In the North America playoffs bracket, San Francisco defeated the eighth-seeded Washington Justice, the seventh-seeded Atlanta Reign, and top-seeded Philadelphia Fusion to advance to the Grand Finals bracket. The Shock faced Seoul Dynasty in the first round of the Grand Finals bracket on October 8. After the Shock came out with a quick 2–0 lead, the Dynasty evened up the score, winning the following two maps; however, San Francisco won the final map of the match and moved on to the upper bracket finals. The team faced Asia's top-seeded Shanghai Dragons in the upper finals, where, again, the Shock started the match with a 2–0 lead, but the Dragons tied up the series after four maps. The Shock won the final map of the match to advance to the Grand Finals match. The Shock faced the Seoul Dynasty in the Grand Finals on October 10. Behind Grand Finals MVP Striker, the Shock defeated the Dynasty by a score of 4–2 to win their second consecutive OWL championship.

2021–present 
In the offseason preceding the 2021 season, the Shock made several roster changes, including the departures of Moth and Ans and the signings of support player Brice "FDGoD" Monscavoir and damage player Charlie "nero" Zwarg. Through the first half of the season, the Shock had a 7–1 regular season record, but they were unable to make either of the season's first two interregional tournaments, the May Melee and June Joust, falling in the regional knockouts both times. Prior to the start of the third tournament cycle, the Summer Showdown, Striker retired from competitive Overwatch. The same day that Striker's retirement was announced, the Shock signed Ans back to the team. San Francisco ended the regular season with a 12–4 record but were unable to make it to any of the four midseason tournaments. The Shock qualified for the season playoffs after taking down the Toronto Defiant on September 5 in the Western play-in tournament. In the first round of the playoffs, the Shock lost to the top-seeded Shanghai Dragons, 0–3, on September 21. Falling to the lower bracket after the loss, San Francisco defeated the Philadelphia Fusion and Chengdu Hunters in the following days. Their season came to an end in the following match, as they lost to the Atlanta Reign, 1–3.

Following the 2021 season, the Shock parted ways with their entire roster, aside from Viol2t. The team picked up five rookies to fill their squad: damage players Jung "Kilo" Jin-woo, Kim "Proper" Dong-hyun, and Samuel "s9mm" Santos, tank player Colin "Coluge" Arai, and support player Oh "FiNN" Se-jin. The Shock began their 2022 season with a 3–0 win over the Paris Eternal. In the first tournament cycle of the season, the Kickoff Clash, the Shock went undefeated in the qualifiers, going 6–0, and qualified for the Western Kickoff Clash tournament as the top seed. In the tournament, the team ultimately lost to the Fuel in the lower bracket. Prior to the start of the second tournament cycle, the Midseason Madness, they picked up tank player Michael "mikeyy" Konicki. The Shock went undefeated in the Midseason Madness qualifiers, improving their record to 12–0, and qualified as the top seed in the tournament. After winning every match in the upper bracket, the Shock faced the Los Angeles Gladiators in the Midseason Madness finals. However, they lost in the finals by a score of 2–4. The Shock broke the OWL record for most consecutive regular season wins during the next tournament cycle, the Summer Showdown, winning 20 matches in a row, spanning back to the 2021 regular season. The team had their first regular season loss of the season on September 2, after they were defeated by the Fuel. With a 5–1 record in the qualifiers, the Shock advanced to the Western Summer Showdown tournament as the second seed. However, they lost to the Fuel in the finals. Prior to the end of the regular season, the Shock re-signed Striker, who had been a part of the Shock's championship seasons in 2019 and 2020. The team finished the regular season as the second seed in the Western region. Proper received numerous accolades for his performance in the regular season, being commentated as a Role Star for damage, being named the Alarm Rookie of the Year, and earning the Most Valuable Player award. The Shock lost in their first match in the playoffs against the sixth-seeded Houston Outlaws and were sent to the lower bracket. From there, San Francisco made a run through the lower bracket to reach the 2022 Grand Finals. The Shock faced the Fuel in the Grand Finals match. The match went to seven maps; San Francisco lost by a score of 3–4.

Team identity 
On October 16, 2017, the San Francisco brand was officially unveiled. The franchise name was revealed as San Francisco Shock. The team's logo features a seismograph in the shape of the San Francisco–Oakland Bay Bridge in the team's colors of orange, grey, and gold. The name "Shock" and the logo were chosen to represent the large amounts of seismic energy that are present in the San Francisco area. The color gold was chosen to honor the 1849 California Gold Rush that swept the city. "We took great care to choose a logo and identity that would both represent the attributes and traditions of San Francisco, yet at the same time speak to the future of sports and the Shock’s ambitions to take its place as a fixture next to the Bay Area’s championship sports teams," Andy Miller, CEO of NRG Esports, said in a statement. Prior to the 2020 season, the colors were changed to black, silver, and orange, with the black and silver paying tribute to the Oakland Raiders.

Personnel

Current roster

Head coaches

Awards and records

Seasons overview

Individual accomplishments 

Season MVP
sinatraa (Jay Won) – 2019

Grand Finals MVP
ChoiHyoBin (Choi Hyo-bin) – 2019
Striker (Kwon Nam-joo) – 2020

Role Star selections
Moth (Grant Espe) – 2019
sinatraa (Jay Won) – 2019
Super (Matthew DeLisi) – 2019
ChoiHyoBin (Choi Hyo-bin) – 2019, 2020
Ans (Lee Seon-chang) – 2020
Viol2t (Park Min-Ki) – 2020

All-Star Game selections
Architect (Park Min-ho) – 2018
sleepy (Nikola Andrews) – 2018
sinatraa (Jay Won) – 2019
super (Matthew DeLisi) – 2019, 2020
Viol2t (Park Min-Ki) – 2019, 2020
Ans (Lee Seon-chang) – 2020
ChoiHyoBin (Choi Hyo-bin) – 2020
Moth (Grant Espe) – 2020

Academy team

On February 26, 2018, the Shock formally announced their academy team would compete under the "NRG Esports" name for Overwatch Contenders North America. They also revealed the team would live, train, and play in Washington, D.C., operating under a training home provided by partners Events DC.

On May 8, 2019, NRG Esports announced that the organization would no longer field an Overwatch Contenders roster.

Seasons overview

References

External links 

 

 
Esports teams based in the United States
Overwatch League teams
2017 establishments in California
Esports teams established in 2017
NRG Esports